Brian Nielsen may refer to:

Brian Nielsen (boxer) (born 1965), Danish boxer
Brian Nielsen (footballer) (born 1987), Danish footballer for New York Red Bulls 
Brian Steen Nielsen (born 1968), Danish former footballer for Aarhus GF